Discaria pubescens, the hairy anchor plant or Australian anchor plant, is a species of flowering plant in the family Rhamnaceae. It is native to Tasmania, Victoria, New South Wales and Queensland in Australia.

References

pubescens
Flora of New South Wales
Flora of Queensland
Flora of Tasmania
Flora of Victoria (Australia)
Rosales of Australia
Rare flora of Australia
Taxa named by Adolphe-Théodore Brongniart
Taxa named by George Claridge Druce